The Ripoll is a river in the comarca of Vallès Occidental, Catalonia, Spain. It covers the vast majority of the shire, crossing it from north to south, and flows into the river Besòs, near Barcelona.

Geography

It covers the vast majority of the comarca of Vallès Occidental, passing through the municipalities of Sant Llorenç Savall, Castellar del Vallès, Sabadell, Barberà del Vallès, Ripollet and Montcada i Reixac. Throughout the comarca, it crosses alluvial clay terrains, which erodes easily, causing the river to carve a deep path into the soil.

History

Throughout its history, the river was used by the inhabitants of the surrounding area for irrigation. Irrigation has been in place from at least the mid-10th century, when priests of Sant Llorenç built an irrigation system that is still used to work the orchards along the riverside and mills to produce flour.

As modernization also reached the area, most of the mills were reconverted to produce paper. However, by the 18th century, the production of paper had ceased to be a dominant industry along the river.

During the 19th century, the mills of the riverside were reconverted again, this time into textile factories, which lasted until the late 20th century. Due to the dyes and chemicals used in the textile industry, the water of the river became heavily polluted.

More recently, because of the Catalan textile crisis, most of the factories were abandoned or reconverted for other uses, lessening the strain on the river's water quality. Recently, there have been initiatives to recover the Ripoll for community recreation, by restoring the river, which had deteriorated due not only to industrial pollution but also to the shanty towns made by immigrants who came to work in the mills from Southern Spain during the 1960s.

1962 disaster

In 1962, the Vallès Occidental suffered a period of strong floods followed by winds that devastated the shire and caused hundreds of deaths. The immigrants from southern Spain who were extremely poor and had settled in the riverside suffered the worst consequences.

See also
 List of rivers of Catalonia

References

External links

 Pictures of the floods and the snowfall of 1962
 Sabadell City Council's website, which contains some pages with information about the river and its history
 Website talking about the floods of 1962 in Terrassa
 A section of the Ripollet City Council's website dedicated to the floods of 1962
 Digital newspaper of the Cerdanyola City Council

Rivers of Spain
Vallès Occidental
Rivers of Catalonia